Barbara Špiler (born 2 January 1992 in Brežice, Slovenia) is a Slovenian athlete who competes in the hammer throw. Špiler represented Slovenia at the 2012 Summer Olympics in London, where she finished 29th in the qualification round.

Competition record

References

1992 births
Living people
Slovenian hammer throwers
Athletes (track and field) at the 2012 Summer Olympics
Olympic athletes of Slovenia
People from Brežice
Female hammer throwers
Slovenian female athletes